Roland George Arthur Asselin (May 18, 1917 – December 7, 2003) was a Canadian fencer. He competed at the 1948, 1952 and 1956 Summer Olympics.

References

External links
 

1917 births
2003 deaths
Canadian male fencers
Olympic fencers of Canada
Fencers at the 1948 Summer Olympics
Fencers at the 1952 Summer Olympics
Fencers at the 1956 Summer Olympics
Commonwealth Games medallists in fencing
Commonwealth Games gold medallists for Canada
Commonwealth Games silver medallists for Canada
Commonwealth Games bronze medallists for Canada
Fencers at the 1954 British Empire and Commonwealth Games
Fencers at the 1958 British Empire and Commonwealth Games
20th-century Canadian people
21st-century Canadian people
Medallists at the 1954 British Empire and Commonwealth Games
Medallists at the 1958 British Empire and Commonwealth Games